Dismorphia teresa is a butterfly in the  family Pieridae. It is found in Ecuador.

References

Dismorphiinae
Butterflies described in 1869
Pieridae of South America
Taxa named by William Chapman Hewitson